The R374 is a Regional Route in South Africa that connects the R31 at Barkly West in the south-west to Windsorton and the N12. Just before Windsorton, the R371 is given off heading north.

External links

References

Regional Routes in the Northern Cape